European Parliament elections were held in Sweden in May 2019 to elect the country's twenty members of the European Parliament.

Opinion polls

Graphical summary

Vote share

Results

Voter demographics
Voter demographics of the 2019 European Parliament election in Sweden, according to the Swedish Television's exit polls.

Gender and age

Employment

Occupation

Union membership

Education

Public/Private sector employment

Foreign born

Church attendance

Referendums
In connection with the 2019 European Parliament elections, two local referendums were held in Sweden. In Svedala municipality, citizens took a stand on whether a prison should be established there, with 67.5% voting no. In the municipalities of Borgholm and Mörbylånga, residents voted on a proposal for a merger to the municipality of Öland, which gave no in both municipalities.

References

Sweden
European Parliament elections in Sweden
Europe